Ayla Oasis is a $1.4 billion redevelopment project in Aqaba, Jordan. It consists of artificial lakes that aim to add 17 new kilometers of beachfront, 1700 hotel rooms, 3000 residential units and will host Jordan's first green golf course.  The 18-hole golf course was designed by Greg Norman.

References

Tourist attractions in Jordan
Aqaba